Miangul Abdul Wadud (Urdu:ميانگل عبد الودود) was the Wāli of Swat and grandson of the Akhund of Swat. He was elected Badshah Sahib (king) of Swat by a loya jirga held at Kabal in November 1918, and was recognized by the British authorities as ruler and formally installed as Wāli of Swat in Saidu Sharif on 3 May 1926. He ruled from 1918 to 1949, when he abdicated in favour of his eldest son, Miangul Jahan Zeb.

Early life and struggle for power 
Miangul Sir Abdul Wadud was born in Saidu Sharif in 1881. He was the elder son of Miangul Abdul Khaliq, and grandson on the maternal side of Aman ul-Mulk, Mehtar of Chitral. He was educated privately. In 1915, when the tribes of Upper Swat elected Sayed Abdul Jabbar Shah as their king, he opposed the election and went into exile at Dalbar from 1915-1916. Abdul Jabbar could not defend the territory in a counterattack on Nawab of Dir in 1916.  Anarchy ensued. Abdul Wadud returned and took up arms against Abdul Jabbar in 1916. As a result, the Jirga of Swat decided to oust Abdul Jabbar king and appointed Abdul Wadud, a grandson of the Akhund of Swat, to replace him in 1917. Abdul Wadud established his rule in Swat and annexed Buner and Chakesar to his dominion. By 1923, he controlled most of the Swat area.

Wāli of Swat 
Abdul Wadud was proclaimed the Wāli of Swat in 1926 with an annual allowance of 10,000 rupees from the government of India. He had three wives, eight daughters and four sons.

Though he was elected king and was locally known as "Bacha" or "Badshah", meaning "king," the British authorities only granted him the title of Wāli, which refers to a religious ruler. Abdul Wadud wanted the title of king but was denied by the British political authorities on the basis that no ruler in India was a king, and that only the King-Emperor in Britain had the right to be styled in such a manner. Abdul Wadud acceded to Pakistan in late 1947.

He abdicated in favour of his eldest son, Miangul Jahan Zeb, on 12 December 1949. Jahan Zeb ruled Swat until its merger with Pakistan in 1969.

Honours and awards
 King George V Silver Jubilee Medal (1935)
 King George VI Coronation Medal (1937)
 Pakistan Medal (1948)

Death 
Abdul Wadud died at the Royal Palace, Aqba (now Iqra Academy), on 1 October 1971 and was buried there at the Badshah Sahib Mausoleum.

See also 
Swat (princely state)
Miangul Jahan Zeb
Wali of Swat

References

External links 
Sultan-i-Rome e - IPCS PDF
About Swat Royal Family & Photographs - Pakistan ... - Apna Swat

Further reading 
Muhammad Altaf Husain, The Story of Swat as told by the Founder, Miangul Abdul Wadud (Badshah Sahib), to Muhammad Asif Khan. Miangul Abdul Wadud (Badshah Sahib), Peshawar, 1963.
Sultan-i-Rome, Swat State, 1915–1969, From Genesis to Merger: An Analysis of Political, Administrative, Socio-Political, and Economic Development, Karachi: Oxford University Press (2008), 

Monarchs who abdicated
People from Swat District
Princely rulers of Pakistan
Nawabs of Pakistan
Swat royal family
1881 births
1971 deaths